The UCI BMX Supercross World Cup 2011 is a multi race tournament over a season of BMX racing. The season runs from 8 April to 1 October 2011. The World Cup is organised by the Union Cycliste Internationale.  In this edition the World Cup consists of four rounds in Pietermaritburg, Papendal, London and Chula Vista.

Series
The 2011 World Cup series was made up of five events. The series featured rounds in Pietermaritzburg, Papaendal, London, Sarasota and Chula Vista. However, in July Sarasota had to pull out of hosting a round leaving the series with just four stops in 2011.

London

160 riders signed up to tackle the challenging Olympic course. The event was one of the first events to take place in the Olympic Park and is part of the London Prepares series. The track is 470 metres long for men and features a berm jump, an S-bend transfer, a box jump and a rhythm section in the final straight. The women's course is 430 metres long featuring three jumps in the opening straight and a tunnel, before like the men's course, including a rhythm section in the final straight. It has been called one of the most challenging BMX tracks to date. The track also features an  starting ramp and was designed by the UCI with the aim of pushing the boundaries of the sport. 14,000 cubic metres of soil was used to build the track.

Home favourite Shanaze Reade and New Zealander Marc Willers took the win in London after a long delay for rain. Rain fell for three hours, meaning that the racing did not get under way until 17:00 local time. However the crowd remained and due to the rain, racing was an elimination, do or die, one run, one chance with the top four from each heat qualifying into the next round. In the final Willers did battle with Sam Willoughby and World Champion Joris Daudet with the pair of them passing him on the Red Bull (box) jump before Willers fought back down the rhythm section to pass the pair of them and to take the London round.

Results

See also

 2013 UCI BMX Supercross World Cup

References

External links

 Pietermaritzburg Website
 Papaendal Website
 London Website

UCI BMX Supercross World Cup
UCI BMX Supercross World Cup
UCI BMX Supercross World Cup, 2011